Paul Michael McAnulty (born February 24, 1981) is a former Major League Baseball outfielder. He played college baseball at Long Beach State.

Major League Baseball

San Diego Padres
Drawing comparisons with former Padre and Phillie great John Kruk, he was mainly used as a pinch hitter, or called up when one of the starting outfielders was injured.

On September 6, he made a nice impression on Padres fans with a pinch hit, walk-off home run in the 11th inning versus the Colorado Rockies. During the  season, he had a stint where he was a starting outfielder on the depleted San Diego roster.

Boston Red Sox
On November 19, 2008, he signed a minor league deal with the Boston Red Sox.

On July 24, 2009, the Red Sox announced his release after only hitting .233 with Pawtucket.

Colorado Rockies
On August 10, 2009, McAnulty signed a minor league contract with the Colorado Rockies. In November 2009, McAnutly filed for Free Agency.

Los Angeles Angels of Anaheim
McAnulty joined the Los Angeles Angels of Anaheim organization in 2010, playing the majority of the year at their Triple-A club, the Salt Lake Bees. He received some playing time at the Major League level with the Angels, hitting one home run in 24 plate appearances.

He started the 2011 season with the Salt Lake Bees, and on July 22, 2012, he was sent to the Arkansas Travelers, the Angels Double-A club.

Coaching career
Paul was the hitting coach for the Burlington Bees, a Class A minor league baseball team for the Los Angeles Angels, for the 2014 season. He was the co-hitting coach for AZL League Angels 2015 and 2016 seasons. As of 2019, Paul is the hitting coach of the South Bend Cubs.

References

External links

Major League Baseball outfielders
Baseball players from California
San Diego Padres players
Los Angeles Angels players
Idaho Falls Padres players
Fort Wayne Wizards players
Lake Elsinore Storm players
Mobile BayBears players
Portland Beavers players
Arizona League Padres players
Colorado Springs Sky Sox players
Pawtucket Red Sox players
Arkansas Travelers players
Salt Lake Bees players
Long Beach State Dirtbags baseball players
1981 births
Living people
Sportspeople from Oxnard, California
Peoria Javelinas players
Sportspeople from Ventura County, California